3 Tales of Horror is an illustrated collection of stories by American author H. P. Lovecraft. It was released in 1967 by Arkham House in an edition of 1,522 copies.  The book includes 15 drawings by American artist Lee Brown Coye.

Contents

3 Tales of Horror contains the following stories:

 "The Colour Out of Space"
 "The Dunwich Horror"
 "The Thing on the Doorstep"

References

1967 short story collections
Short story collections by H. P. Lovecraft
Arkham House books